David Kerr (3 February 1899 – 6 March 1969) was a  Scotland international rugby union player. He became the 74th President of the Scottish Rugby Union.

Rugby union career

Amateur career
He played for Heriots.

Provincial career
He played for Edinburgh District in the 1923 inter-city match.

International career
He received 10 caps for Scotland from 1923 to 1928.

Administrative career
He was President of the Scottish Rugby Union for the period 1960 to 1961.

Military career
In the First World War he joined the 2nd Battalion Argyll and Sutherland Highlanders as a 3rd Lieutenant. He went to France on 20 October 1918.

References

1899 births
1969 deaths
Scottish rugby union players
Presidents of the Scottish Rugby Union
Edinburgh District (rugby union) players
Scotland international rugby union players
Heriot's RC players
Rugby union players from Edinburgh
Rugby union props